My Shiralee is a studio album by Australian blues and country musician, Broderick Smith, which was released in 1994 (see Music in 1994) on the Newmarket Music label. Smith provided lead vocals, harmonica and wrote lyrics for ten of the twelve tracks. His backing band included Tony Day on drums; Gerry Hale on mandolin, fiddle and autoharp; Michel Rose on pedal steel; and Matt Walker on acoustic guitar, dobro, lap steel. The Ages Mike Daly rated the album as one of his top ten releases of the year. A CD version of My Shiralee was issued in 1998.

Track listing

Personnel 

My Shiralee by Broderick Smith is credited to:

Musicians
 Broderick Smith – vocals, harmonica
 Randy Bulpin – guitar, gut string guitar, slide guitar
 Tony Day – drums
 Robert B. Dillon – drums
 Gerry Hale – autoharp, mandolin, acoustic guitar, violin, banjo
 Phil Hyde – acoustic guitar, backing vocals
 Joe Imbroll – bass guitar
 Michael Rose – pedal steel
 Nick Smith – backing vocals
 Kirk Steele – accordion
 Matt Walker – lap steel, dobro

Recording details
 Producer – The Guild
 Engineer, mixer, digital master – Robert B. Dillon
 Recording studio – Newmarket Studios, North Melbourne, Victoria

Artwork
 Front cover photography – Vicki Bell
 Inside black & white photo of children – Brod's Dad
 Additional black & white photography – Tim Riches
 Man & boy shot – Mick O’Connor 
 Design – Jane Ferrusi (Dex Audio)

References 

1994 albums